Celesdonio Abeso Oyono Mate (born 15 August 1998), known as Celesdonio, is an Equatoguinean footballer who plays as a forward for Spanish Tercera División RFEF club UD Gran Tarajal and the Equatorial Guinea national team.

Club career
Celesdonio has played for Cano Sport Academy in Equatorial Guinea, for SC Esmoriz in Portugal and for Llanera in Spain.

International career
Celesdonio made his international debut for Equatorial Guinea in 2018.

International goals
Scores and results list Equatorial Guinea's goal tally first.

References

1998 births
Living people
People from Bata, Equatorial Guinea
Equatoguinean footballers
Association football forwards
Equatorial Guinea international footballers
Cano Sport Academy players
Segunda Federación players
Tercera Federación players
Equatoguinean expatriate footballers
Equatoguinean expatriate sportspeople in Portugal
Expatriate footballers in Portugal
Equatoguinean expatriate sportspeople in Spain
Expatriate footballers in Spain